Higherlife Foundation is a philanthropic organisation founded in 1996 by Strive and Tsitsi Masiyiwa. Since inception, foundation has been supporting orphaned and vulnerable children in Africa through education and material support. Education support has been provided through the Capernaum Scholarship for orphaned and vulnerable children and the Joshua Nkomo Scholarship for highly gifted children. Other than Education support, the foundation also supports beneficiaries with Guardianship and Pastoral Care. In the communities it serves, the foundation partners with healthcare and crisis response institutions.

History

Founded in 1996 by Strive and Tsitsi Masiyiwa, the foundation formerly operated as the Capernaum Trust, offering primary, secondary and University scholarships to orphaned and vulnerable  children.

In 2005, the Joshua Nkomo Scholarship fund for the talented and gifted was launched for highly gifted students that did not fall into the orphaned and vulnerable category. In 2006, the Christian Community Partnership Trust was launched to  offer pastoral support to the vulnerable.

In 2008, the foundation launched the Waterford Kamhlaba scholarship to take Joshua Nkomo Scholarship beneficiaries to  Waterford Kamhlaba College in Swaziland.

In 2008, the foundation ventured into health and  crisis relief through the National Health Care Trust which participated in the fight against  the 2008 Zimbabwean cholera outbreak  Tokwe Mukosi disaster in Zimbabwe as well as the fight against Ebola in Africa.

In 2010, the foundation spread its footprint to Lesotho and Burundi.

In the period 2010- 2015, the foundation achieved the following:

 Launched the Andrew Young Scholarship with Morehouse College and Spelman College in Atlanta, Georgia.
 Launched the learning hub project in Zimbabwe, Lesotho and Burundi, to improve access to internet infrastructure in these countries.
 Developed Ruzivo Smart learning platform to improve quality of education of its beneficiaries.
 Launched Muzinda idea incubation center to encourage Zimbabwean startups.
 Partnered with Econet Wireless in The Energize The Chain initiative.
 Participated in the Tokwe Mukorsi Dam crisis relief programme.

In 2015 the Higherlife Foundation merged all four Trusts into one foundation, focused on education. It also  partnered with Yale University in the Yale Young African Scholars Programme.

Basic Education
The Higherlife Foundation Basic Education programme is delivered through the Capernaum Scholarship, a scholarship targeted at orphaned and vulnerable children between the ages of 5 and 18 years. The scholarship includes fees and tuition from early childhood to high school and has been running for the past 19 years. Higherlife foundations biggest programmes are currently running in Zimbabwe, Lesotho and Burundi. In Zimbabwe the scholarship supports eligible children in Grade 1 to Form 4. In Lesotho it offers scholarships to eligible children in Form A to Form D, while in Burundi the scholarship covers eligible children from Grade 1 to Grade 10. Along with the academic education, the Basic Education programme incorporates mentorship, life skills training and specialized psychosocial support led by the Foundation’s Guardianship and Pastoral Care unit, in collaboration with expert partners. The scholarship program covers tuition, management levies, examination fees and other support materials. Capernaum Scholars in dire need of food are supplied with food hampers. In addition, scholars with Chronic diseases and those who fall sick/ill receive supplies of medication and visit Hospitals/Clinics.

Talent development
The  foundation's  talent development programme is delivered through the merit-based Joshua Nkomo Scholarship. The programme, now in its 10th year, focuses on identifying young African talent through a rigorous selection process and creating the opportunity for them to get the best and most relevant education at world-class local and overseas tertiary learning institutions. The programme includes leadership training and mentorship through internships, community involvement and lifelong engagement through an active alumni network. The Joshua Nkomo scholarships are offered to the best students in the final 2 to 3 years of high school, and top university and college students in their first and straight Master's degrees. The Higherlife Foundation Talent Development programme currently offers merit scholarships to gifted students in several African countries, including Zimbabwe, Burundi, Lesotho, Rwanda and Ghana.

Response to crisis
The foundation's Health and Crisis support programme works with partners in health to address health issues that would negatively affect beneficiaries’ health and their ability to access quality education.
It works to alleviate and prevent epidemics and disease outbreaks that affect children. It partners with relevant public and private partners to mitigate the impact of health crises and natural disasters on communities in which Higherlife Foundation's beneficiaries live.

Pastoral care
The Higherlife Foundation Guardianship and Pastoral Care programme addresses the social issues that affect its beneficiaries’ ability to learn, excel and lead normal lives. It focuses on empowering the children served by the foundation with psychosocial support and essential life skills needed to overcome the stigma and emotional and psychological challenges of growing up as an orphaned child. The Guardianship and Pastoral Care programme also works in collaboration with expert partners, governments and policy makers to ensure the protection of the fundamental rights of children in general, and the rights of   girl children in particular.

References

1996 establishments in Zimbabwe
Charities based in Zimbabwe
Educational charities